San Miguel Chicaj is a town and municipality in the Baja Verapaz department of Guatemala. San Miguel Chicaj has an area of 280 Km², which makes one of the largest municipality of Baja Verapaz Department. It has a population of 33,131 (2018 census), mostly of achí background.

History 
According to an old local legend, the name "San Miguel Chicaj" came from the time that Saint Michael Archangel descended from Heaven and landed on the region.

On the Municipality of Salamá minutes, San Miguel Chicaj was founded on 23 October 1803 and raised to fourth category municipality in 1877, by the government of general Justo Rufino Barrios.

Commercial activities 
San Miguel Chijal is a farming community; its main produces are corn, beans and sugar cane, while its people also works with chickens and livestock, producing eggs, meat and several dairy products.

Climate

San Miguel Chicaj has a tropical savanna climate (Köppen: Aw).

Geographic location

See also 

 Baja Verapaz
 Guatemala
 Salamá

Notes and references

References

Bibliography

 
 
 
 

Municipalities of the Baja Verapaz Department